James Morgan is a former Welsh international lawn and indoor bowler.

Bowls career
He won a bronze medal in the pairs at the 1978 Commonwealth Games in Edmonton.

Eight years later won a gold medal in the fours at the 1986 Commonwealth Games in Edinburgh with Hafod Thomas, Robert Weale and Will Thomas.

In between he also played in the fours at the 1982 Commonwealth Games. He played for the Barry Athletic Bowling Club which he joined in 1961. he was a Welsh international from 1972-1988.

He is a two times Welsh National Champion, winning the fours in 1963 and 1969 when bowling for the Barry Athletic Bowls Club. He also won the 1964 British Isles Bowls Championships fours title.

References

Living people
Welsh male bowls players
Bowls players at the 1978 Commonwealth Games
Bowls players at the 1982 Commonwealth Games
Bowls players at the 1986 Commonwealth Games
Commonwealth Games gold medallists for Wales
Commonwealth Games bronze medallists for Wales
Commonwealth Games medallists in lawn bowls
1933 births
Medallists at the 1978 Commonwealth Games
Medallists at the 1986 Commonwealth Games